Knight Island is an island  long, lying  west of Reeve Island in the Wauwermans Islands, in the Wilhelm Archipelago, Antarctica. The island was shown on an Argentine government chart of 1950. It was named by the UK Antarctic Place-Names Committee in 1958 after The Knight, one of the characters in Chaucer's The Canterbury Tales.

See also 
 List of Antarctic and sub-Antarctic islands

References

Islands of the Wilhelm Archipelago